Gates is a surname, and may refer to:

Gates family
The Gates family of Seattle, Washington. Members of this family include:

 Bill Gates (born 1955),  Co-founder of Microsoft and Bill & Melinda Gates Foundation
 Melinda French Gates (born 1964), American philanthropist, ex-wife of Bill Gates
 William H. Gates, Sr. (1925-2020), American attorney and philanthropist, Bill's father
 Mary Maxwell Gates (1929-1994), American philanthropist, Bill's mother
 Mimi Gardner Gates (born 1942), American art historian, William Sr.'s second wife

Athletes
 Antonio Gates (born 1980), American football player
 Barbara Gates (1934–2000), American baseball player
 Bobby Gates (born 1985), American golf player
 Brent Gates (born 1970), American professional baseball player
 Clyde Gates (born 1986), American football player
 DeMarquis Gates (born 1996), American football player
 George Gates (footballer) (1883–1960), English footballer
 Kaiser Gates (born 1996), American basketball player for Hapoel Jerusalem of the Israeli Basketball Premier League
 Leonard Gates (born 1970), American darts player
 Lionel Gates (born 1982), American football player
 Mathew Gates (born 1975), American figure skater
 Pop Gates (1917–1999), American basketball player
 Yancy Gates (born 1989), American basketball player

Civil servants
 Artemus Gates (1895–1976), American financier and Undersecretary of the Navy during World War II
 Charles W. Gates (1856–1927), 20th century governor of Vermont
 Daryl Gates (1926–2010), American police officer best known as Los Angeles police chief
 Francis H. Gates (1839–1925), New York state senator
 Mickey Gates (born 1959), member of the Arkansas House of Representatives
 Nathaniel H. Gates (1811-1889), American lawyer and politician
 Ralph F. Gates (1893–1978), governor of Indiana 1945-1949
 Robert Gates (born 1943), former president of Texas A&M, former CIA director, 22nd United States Secretary of Defense
 Seth Merrill Gates (1800–1877), 19th century American politician
 Thomas Gates (disambiguation), several people
 Sir Thomas Gates (governor) (1585–1621), Governor of colonial Virginia
 Thomas S. Gates, Jr. (1906–1983), American politician

Other people
 Bill Gates (frontiersman), participant in the Klondike Gold Rush
 Charles Gates, Jr. (1921–2005), of the Gates Rubber Company
 Charles Gilbert Gates (1876–1913), American stock broker
 Christopher T. Gates, American philanthropist 
 Crawford Gates, American composer and musician
 David Gates (born 1940), singer-songwriter
 David Gates (author) (born 1947), author-journalist
 Debbie Gates, British television writer-producer
 Deborah Gates, American actress
 Frank Gates (1920–1978), American professional basketball player
 Frank Caleb Gates (1887–1955), American botanist and plant ecologist
 Frank P. Gates (1895–1975), American architect
 Frederick Taylor Gates, American Baptist minister and advisor to the Rockefeller family
 Gareth Gates, British pop musician
 Giacomo Gates, American jazz musician
 Henry Louis Gates, Jr. (born 1950), American scholar
 Hilliard Gates, American sports journalist
 Horatio Gates (1726–1806), Revolutionary War American general
 Ivan R. Gates (1890–1932), American aviator and entrepreneur
 J. Gabriel Gates, American author
 John Gates, American political activist
 John Gates (courtier), 16th century English soldier and courtier 
 John Warne Gates, American industrialist
 Julius W. Gates, onetime Sergeant Major of the U.S. Army
 Ken Gates, pseudonym for American voice actor Rodger Parsons
 Kevin Gates (born 1986), American rapper
 Larry Gates, American actor
 Lee Gates (1937–2020), American blues guitarist, singer, and songwriter
 Merrill Edward Gates, American scholar
 Nancy Gates (1926–2019), American actress
 Phyllis Gates, wife of Rock Hudson
 Raydon Gates, Australian navy admiral
 Rick Gates (Internet pioneer), American software developer
 Rick Gates (political consultant), American political consultant and lobbyist
 Robert Franklin Gates) (1906–1982), American artist and professor
 Robert McFarland Gates (1883–1962), American engineer
 Sylvester James Gates, American theoretical physicist
 Synyster Gates, American guitarist
 Theophilus Gates (1787–1846), American religious leader
 Tucker Gates, American television director
 Vickie Gates, American female bodybuilder
 William Gates (basketball), protagonist from the 1994 movie Hoop Dreams
 William Thomas George Gates (1908–1990), businessman

Fictional characters
 Conrad Gates, fictional British television character
 Elsa Gates, fictional British television character
 Jack Gates, fictional British television character
 Tony Gates, fictional American television character
 Benjamin Franklin Gates, in the National Treasure franchise, played by Nicolas Cage
 (Unknown) Gates, fictional anime character

See also
Gaetz, surname

English-language surnames

fr:Gates#Personnalités